The Parachute Jump is a defunct amusement ride and a landmark in the New York City borough of Brooklyn, along the Riegelmann Boardwalk at Coney Island. Twelve cantilever steel arms radiate from the top of the tower; when the ride was in operation, each arm supported a parachute attached to a lift rope and a set of guide cables. Riders were belted into a two-person canvas seat, lifted to the top, and dropped. The parachute and shock absorbers at the bottom would slow their descent.

The ride was built for the 1939 New York World's Fair at Flushing Meadows–Corona Park, also in New York City. Capped by a  flagpole, it was the tallest structure at the Fair. In 1941, after the World's Fair, it was moved to its current location in the Steeplechase amusement park on Coney Island. It ceased operations in the 1960s following the park's closure, and the frame fell into disrepair.

Despite proposals to either demolish or restore the ride, disputes over its use caused it to remain unused through the 1980s. The Parachute Jump has been renovated several times since the 1990s, both for stability and for aesthetic reasons. In the 2000s, it was restored and fitted with a lighting system. The lights were activated in 2006 and replaced in a subsequent project in 2013. It has been lit up in commemoration of events such as the death of Kobe Bryant. The ride, the only remaining portion of Steeplechase Park, is a New York City designated landmark and has been listed on the National Register of Historic Places.

Description 

The Parachute Jump is on the Riegelmann Boardwalk at Coney Island between West 16th and West 19th Streets. It consists of a hexagonal base, upon which stands a six-sided steel structure. Each of the tower's legs consists of a  flange column braced with horizontal ribs at  intervals and diagonal ribs between the horizontal beams. The legs are grounded on concrete foundations, each of which contains twelve timber piles. The diagonal and horizontal ribs intersect at gusset plates, which contain splices at  intervals and are riveted to the base. A ladder is on the north side of the structure, extending from the top of the base. There are anti-climbing devices on the frame. The frame has about 8,000 lighting fixtures, which are used for night-time light shows. The tower's wide base gives it stability, while the top is tapered off.

Twelve drop points are at the top, marked by structural steel arms, which extend outward  from the tower's center, and support octagonal subframes at the far end of each arm. Eight parachute guidelines were suspended from each subframe, which helped keep the parachute open. A circular structure runs atop the subframes, connecting them to each other. Walkways were above the top of the tower, as well as along each arm.

Functional parachutes dangled from each of the twelve sub-frames and were held open by metal rings. Each parachute required three cable operators. Riders were belted into two-person canvas seats hanging below the closed parachutes. The parachutes would open as the riders were hoisted to the top of the ride, where release mechanisms would drop them. The parachutes could be stopped at any time during the ascent, but not once they had been released from the top of the tower. Shock absorbers at the bottom, consisting of pole-mounted springs, cushioned the landing.

The base consists of a two-story pavilion. The upper floor housed mechanical structures and hoisting machinery, while the ground floor contained ticket booths and a waiting room. The pavilion has six sides divided by fluted piers which slope upward toward the corrugated galvanized-iron roof. The upper floor of the pavilion has red, yellow, and blue walls. The lower floor, below the height of the boardwalk, contained fenced-off open space. The  concrete platform surrounding the pavilion is several steps beneath the boardwalk level. An access ramp was at the northeast corner of the platform.

Because of its shape, the Parachute Jump has been nicknamed the "Eiffel Tower of Brooklyn". The New York Daily News compared the structure to an Erector Set toy, while a writer for City Journal said it resembled a mushroom. Several works of media, such as Little Fugitive (1953), have also been filmed at the Parachute Jump.

Precursors 

By the 1930s, parachutists could be trained by jumping from parachute towers rather than from aircraft. Accordingly, Stanley Switlik and George P. Putnam built a  tower on Switlik's farm in Ocean County, New Jersey. The tower, which was designed to train airmen in parachute jumping, was first publicly used on June 2, 1935, when Amelia Earhart jumped from it.

The "parachute device" was patented by retired U.S. Naval Commander James H. Strong along with Switlik, inspired by early practice towers Strong had seen in the Soviet Union, where simple wooden towers had been used to train paratroopers since the 1920s. Strong designed a safer version of the tower, which included eight guide wires in a circle surrounding the parachute. Strong filed a patent in 1935 and built several test platforms at his home in Hightstown, New Jersey, in 1936 and 1937. The military platforms suspended a single rider in a harness and offered a few seconds of free fall after the release at the top before the chutes opened to slow the fall. In response to high civilian interest in trying out the ride, Strong modified his invention for non-military use, making some design changes. These included a seat that could hold two people, a larger parachute for a slower drop, a metal ring to hold it open, and shock-absorbing springs to ease the final landing.

Strong sold military versions of the tower to the Romanian and U.S. armies, as well as installed towers in New Jersey and Fort Benning, Georgia. He converted an existing observation tower in Chicago's Riverview Park into a six-chute amusement ride. This enterprise, the "Pair-O-Chutes", performed well enough that Strong applied to build and operate a jump at the 1939 New York World's Fair. Another jump, also reportedly designed by Strong, was installed at the Exposition Internationale des Arts et Techniques dans la Vie Moderne in Paris in 1937.

Operation

1939 World's Fair 

Construction officially began at the 1939 World's Fair in December 1938; it was to be in the Fair's "Amusement Zone", along the eastern shore of Meadow Lake in Flushing Meadows–Corona Park, Queens. Life Savers sponsored the ride, investing $15,000 and decorated its tower with brightly lit, candy-shaped rings. Elwyn E. Seelye & Co. designed the steelwork, Bethlehem Steel manufactured the tower pieces, and Skinner, Cook & Babcock assembled the pieces onsite. Construction cost about $99,000.

It had twelve  parachute bays; while five parachutes were operational upon opening, eleven would eventually be used at the Fair. A  flagpole was added atop the original  tower to surpass the height of a statue within the Soviet Pavilion. The flagpole had been installed because members of the public had objected to the Soviet statue being placed higher than the United States' flag. The trip to the top took about a minute and the drop took between 10 and 20 seconds. The official 1939 Fair guidebook described the Parachute Jump as "one of the most spectacular features of the Amusement Area", calling the attraction "similar to that which the armies of the world use in early stages of training for actual parachute jumping". The Parachute Jump ultimately became the Fair's second-most popular attraction, behind the Billy Rose's Aquacade stage show.

Several incidents occurred within the first few months of the Parachute Jump's opening. On July 12, 1939, entangled cables left a married couple aloft for five hours in the middle of the night. The couple returned to ride again the next day, having been congratulated for their courage by New York City mayor Fiorello H. La Guardia, who had been at the World's Fair when they got stuck. At least two other groups of people became stuck on the Parachute Jump in its first year: a deputy sheriff and his sister-in-law later in July 1939, and two female friends that September.

The Parachute Jump's popularity was negatively affected by its secluded location away from the World's Fair's main entrance. After the Life Savers sponsorship ended at the conclusion of the 1939 season, the ride was relocated closer to the entrance of the New York City Subway's World's Fair station, near the Children's World section of the Fair, at a cost of $88,500. An additional chute and new foundations were added. The relocation was announced in December 1939 and was scheduled to take about three months. The movement of the Parachute Jump and the consolidation of concessions at that location helped improve business for the World's Fair's 1940 season. The reopening was delayed by disagreements between operator International Parachuting Inc. and James Strong. These disagreements included a lawsuit filed by International Parachuting against Strong to prevent him from selling the rights to the ride to third parties.

The Parachute Jump reopened in June 1940, over a month after the Fair's reopening. During the Fair's second operating season, a couple were married on the Parachute Jump in what was described as the first-ever "parachute ceremony". A half-million guests had jumped from the tower before the end of the World's Fair. The Parachute Jump was slated to be sent to either Coney Island in Brooklyn or Palisades Amusement Park in New Jersey following the conclusion of the Fair. Relocation to Coney Island was considered as early as August 1940; both Luna Park and Steeplechase Park were interested in purchasing the ride during this time. After the Fair closed in October 1940, its operators announced that the Parachute Jump would be sent to Coney Island.

Steeplechase Park 

The park was recovering from a September 1939 fire, which had caused  damage and injured 18 people. The fire had destroyed many of the larger attractions, including a Flying Turns roller coaster, whose site stood empty a year after the blaze. The Parachute Jump was disassembled and moved to the site of the Flying Turns coaster, adjacent to the boardwalk. The ride required some modifications in its new, windier, shore-side location, including the addition of  foundations. The relocation was supervised by the engineer Edwin W. Kleinert and architect Michael Mario. Its installation was part of a larger reconstruction of an  section of the boardwalk.

The Jump reopened in May 1941. Unlimited rides on the Parachute Jump were initially included within Steeplechase Park's single admission fee, which cost  at the time of the ride's relocation. Later, the brothers introduced "combination tickets", which included the park admission fee and a predetermined number of ride experiences on any of the attractions in the park. During World War II, when much of the city was subject to a military blackout, the ride stayed lit to serve as a navigational beacon. The Parachute Jump originally used the multicolored chutes from the World's Fair; by the mid-1940s, these had been replaced with white chutes. According to Jim McCollough, a business partner and nephew of the Tilyou brothers, the frame was repainted every year.

The Parachute Jump attracted up to half a million riders during each annual operating season. Most riders reached the top of the tower in just under a minute, whereas their descent took 11–15 seconds. The experience was described as similar to "flying in a free fall". The Parachute Jump was popular among off-duty military personnel, who took their friends and loved ones to the ride. Occasionally, riders became stuck mid-jump or were tangled within the cables. The ride was subject to shutdowns on windy days, especially when breezes exceeded . Furthermore, at least fifteen people were required to operate the Parachute Jump, making it unprofitable.

Coney Island's popularity receded during the 1960s as it underwent increased crime, insufficient parking facilities, and patterns of bad weather. These difficulties were exacerbated by competition from the 1964 New York World's Fair, also in Flushing Meadows–Corona Park, which led to a record low patronage at Steeplechase Park. On September 20, 1964, Steeplechase Park closed for the last time, and the next year, the property was sold to developer Fred Trump. On the site of Steeplechase Park, Trump proposed building a  enclosed dome with recreational facilities and a convention center.

Closure 

The Parachute Jump stopped operating as part of Steeplechase Park upon the latter's closure in 1964. Sources disagree on whether the ride closed permanently or continued to operate until 1968. Local Coney Island historian Charles Denson explained that the Jump closed in 1964 but that many publications give an erroneous date of 1968. The nonprofit Coney Island History Project maintains that the attraction closed in 1964 and the 1968 date was based on an inaccurate newspaper article. The Guide to New York City Landmarks also mentions that the ride closed in 1964, while the Brooklyn Paper says the Jump was shuttered in 1965. A New York Daily News article in 1965 said the Parachute Jump was nonoperational and had "been stripped of its wires and chutes". A New York World-Telegram article the following year described a plan to restore Steeplechase Park, which included turning the Parachute Jump into the "world's largest bird feeding station".

Several sources state the Jump operated until 1968. According to a press release in 1965, when the Parachute Jump was ostensibly still operating, it attracted half a million visitors per year. A Daily News article from 1973 states the ride closed in 1968. Consulting engineer Helen Harrison and the New York City Department of Parks and Recreation's website also cite a closure date of 1968, saying it was one of several small rides that were operated by concessionaires on the site of Steeplechase Park. According to Harrison, the last documented incident on the ride was on May 30, 1968, when a young girl was reported to have gotten stuck halfway through the drop.

Post-closure

Acquisition of site 

In 1966, the Coney Island Chamber of Commerce petitioned New York City's Landmarks Preservation Commission (LPC) to make the Parachute Jump an official city landmark. Trump, however, wanted to sell it as scrap and did not think it was old enough to warrant landmark status. For a time Trump rented out the base area as a concession and it was encircled by a small go-kart track. The city voted in 1968 to acquire the site for $4 million (equivalent to $million in ).

Control of the Jump passed to NYC Parks, the municipal government agency tasked with maintaining recreational facilities in New York City. The agency attempted to sell the Jump at auction in 1971 but received no bids. NYC Parks had planned to demolish the Parachute Jump if no one was willing to buy it. A study conducted in 1972 found the Jump was structurally sound. At the time, there were proposals to give the tower landmark status and install a light show on it.

The city unsuccessfully attempted to redevelop the Steeplechase site as a state park. By the late 1970s, the city government wanted to build an amusement park on the land. Norman Kaufman, who had run a small collection of fairground amusements on the Steeplechase site since the 1960s, was interested in reopening the Parachute Jump. Kaufman was evicted from the site in 1981, ending discussion of that plan.

Landmark status 

After it was abandoned, the Jump became a haunt for teenagers and young adults to climb, while the base became covered with graffiti. Organizations such as the Coney Island Chamber of Commerce and the Gravesend Historical Society decided to save the structure, though the LPC could not consider such a designation unless NYC Parks indicated it was not interested in developing the Parachute Jump site as a park. On July 12, 1977, the LPC designated the tower as a city landmark. When the designation was presented to the New York City Board of Estimate three months later, the board declined to certify the landmark designation. NYC Parks had said the structure would cost $10,000 a year to maintain. Despite the city's reluctance to designate the structure as a landmark, the Parachute Jump was placed on the National Register of Historic Places in 1980.

The city government questioned the tower's safety. A 1982 survey concluded the tower would need a $500,000 renovation to stabilize the ground underneath (equivalent to $million in ) and another $1 million to restore it to operating condition (about $million in ). The survey estimated it would cost at least $300,000 to demolish the structure, making demolition too costly an option. The cheapest option, simply maintaining the structure, would have cost $10,000 a year. The local community board recommended that the Parachute Jump be demolished if it could not be fixed, but NYC Parks commissioner Henry Stern said in January 1984 that his department had "decided to let it stand

Stern dismissed the possibility of making the Parachute Jump operational again, calling it a "totally useless structure" and saying that even the Eiffel Tower had a restaurant. Stern said he welcomed the community's proposals for reusing the Parachute Jump but other agency officials said the plans presented thus far, which included turning the Jump into a giant windmill, were "quixotic, at best". In the mid-1980s, restaurant mogul Horace Bullard proposed rebuilding Steeplechase Park; his plans included making the Parachute Jump operational again. At the time, the Parachute Jump was described as a "symbol of despair" because no real effort had been made to restore or clean up the structure.

In 1987, the LPC hosted meetings to determine the feasibility of granting landmark status to the Parachute Jump, Wonder Wheel, and Coney Island Cyclone. Two years later, on May 23, 1989, the LPC restored city landmark status to the Parachute Jump. Following this, the Board of Estimate granted permission for Bullard to develop his amusement park on the Steeplechase site, including reopening the Parachute Jump. These plans were delayed because of a lack of funds.

Restorations and lighting 

In 1991, the city government announced an  expenditure to prevent the Jump from collapsing, though there was insufficient funding in the city budget. The city government stabilized the structure in 1993 and painted it in its original colors, although the structure still suffered from rust in the salt air. The thrill-ride company Intamin was enlisted to determine whether the Parachute Jump could again be made operational. Bullard's redevelopment plan clashed with another proposal that would build a sports arena, such as a minor-league baseball stadium, on the site. The Bullard deal was negated in 1994, and the site directly north of the Parachute Jump was developed into a sports stadium, KeySpan Park, which opened in 2000.

The New York City Economic Development Corporation (NYCEDC) assumed responsibility for the tower in 2000. Originally, the city government wanted to reopen it as a functioning ride. This plan was abandoned since the cost of bringing the Jump to safety standards would have been excessively high. The planned renovation would have cost , excluding the high insurance premiums that would need to be paid on the attraction.

2002 restoration and first lighting project 

In 2002, the EDC started renovating the Parachute Jump for $5 million. The NYCEDC contracted engineering firm STV to rehabilitate the structure. The upper part of the tower was dismantled, about two-thirds of the original structure was taken down, some of it replaced, and the structure was painted red. The restoration was completed around July 2003. Upon the completion of the project, Brooklyn Borough president Marty Markowitz started studying proposals to reuse or reopen the structure. In 2004, STV subcontracted Leni Schwendinger Light Projects to develop a night-time lighting concept for the Parachute Jump. Schwendinger contracted Phoster Industries for the LED portion of the lighting project. Markowitz's office, NYC Parks, the NYCEDC, Schwendinger, and STV collaborated for two years on the project, which cost $1.45 million.

The Coney Island Development Corporation and the Van Alen Institute held an architecture contest in 2004 to determine future uses for the  pavilion at the Jump's base. More than 800 competitors from 46 countries participated. The results were announced the following year; there were one winning team, two runners-up with cash prizes, and nine honorable mentions. The winning design outlined a bowtie-shaped pavilion with lighting and an all-season activity center, which included a souvenir shop, restaurant, bar, and exhibition space.

The first night-time light show was held on July 7, 2006. The installation contained six animations and used most colors except for green, which would not have been visible on the tower's red frame. The animations were based on events in the local calendar, including the boardwalk's operating and non-operating seasons, the lunar cycle, the Coney Island Mermaid Parade, and national holidays such as Memorial Day and Labor Day. There is also a sequence called "Kaleidoscope" for other holidays. Officials said the lights were to be left on from dusk to midnight during summer and from dusk to 11:00 p.m. the rest of the year. In observance of the "Lights Out New York" initiative, which sought to reduce bird deaths from light pollution, the tower lighting went dark at 11:00 p.m. during the bird migratory seasons.

2013 restoration and second lighting project 

Although Markowitz was initially satisfied with Schwendinger's light installation, by 2007 he was referring to her installation as "Phase I" of a multi-portion lighting upgrade. In February 2008, the city began planning a second phase of lights. Anti-climbing devices were installed on the Parachute Jump in 2010 after several instances of people scaling the structure, and the lights were temporarily turned off in 2011 because of a lack of maintenance. Concurrently, starting in 2011, the  site around the tower was redeveloped as Steeplechase Plaza.

A $2 million renovation was completed in 2013, after which it contained 8,000 LED lights, in comparison with the 450 total after the first installation. The B&B Carousell, an early-20th-century carousel that had become part of Luna Park, was relocated to Steeplechase Plaza east of the Parachute Jump in 2013. The tower was lit up for its first New Year's Eve Ball drop at the end of 2014, and since then, the Parachute Jump has been lit for New Year's Eve each year. The Parachute Jump has also been lit up in recognition of special causes, such as World Autism Awareness Day and Ovarian Cancer Awareness Month, as well as to commemorate notable personalities, such as happened after the 2020 death of retired NBA basketball player Kobe Bryant.

See also 

 Great Gasp
 Jumpin' Jellyfish
 List of New York City Designated Landmarks in Brooklyn
 National Register of Historic Places listings in Brooklyn
 Texas Chute Out

References

Notes

Citations

Sources

External links 

Oral histories about the Parachute Jump collected by the Coney Island History Project
 
 

1939 establishments in New York City
1939 New York World's Fair
Amusement rides introduced in 1939
Buildings and structures on the National Register of Historic Places in New York City
Coney Island
Cultural history of New York City
Historic American Engineering Record in New York City
National Register of Historic Places in Brooklyn
New York City Designated Landmarks in Brooklyn
Parachute towers
Relocated buildings and structures in New York City
Removed amusement attractions
World's fair architecture in New York City